Ayoub Odisho Barjam (born 15 December 1960), is an Iraqi Assyrian former football player and coach of Al Zawraa in the Iraqi Premier League.

Playing career

Ayoub was a tough tackling full-back, who played for Al-Talaba during a playing career that spanned 14 years. The right-sided defender joined the Students club in 1976, making his debut in a 1–0 win over Al-Shurta a year later. The defender, was one of the best defenders in the Iraqi league during the 1980s. He played alongside the likes of Hussein Saeed, Wathiq Aswad, Ali Hussein Shihab, Haris Mohammed and Adnan Dirjal during his career with the great club, helping Al-Talaba to three league titles in 1981, 1982 and 1986.

He made his international debut on 9 February 1979 in the 1-1 draw with East Germany in a friendly game in Baghdad and went on to make 38 appearances for Iraq, including playing at the 1982 Gulf Cup in the UAE and the Asian Games victory in New Delhi that same year but due to injuries a year on he lost his place in the side to Khalil Allawi. He made his last international appearance in a friendly with Bahrain in 1987.

International goals
Scores and results list Iraq's goal tally first.

Coaching career
Odisho after retiring in 1991, he went on to coach Al-Talaba and Al-Quwa Al-Jawiya, leading Al-Quwa Al-Jawiya to four trophies in the 1996–97 season. He infamously gave an interview at the end of the 1997–98 Iraqi League season telling the cameras how happy he was that Al-Quwa Al Jawiya had won the league title, but midway through the interview he announcer announced that Al-Shorta had won the league with a last minute goal and Odisho stood with a shocked, distraught face. The coach also had a lengthy spell in Lebanon managing Salam Zgharta, Al-Akhaa Ahli Aley and Safa FC. His last coaching job was at Arbil, which he stood down from in late 2011.

Since begin 2012, he is the new coach of Al-Quwa Al-Jawiya.

In October 2013, Odisho was appointed Erbil SC coach for his second stint with the club.

On 23 August 2017, Odisho took lead of Al-Zawra'a SC for two seasons. He led them in 62 games, winning 39 of them and winning the Iraqi league and the Iraqi super cup after a big game against Al-Quwa Al-Jawiya.

Managerial statistics

Honours

Club

As Player

Al-Talaba
Iraqi Premier League: 1980–81, 1981–82, 1985–86

Iraq national team
Asian Games: 1982

As Manager

Al-Talaba
Iraqi Premier League: 1992–93
Iraqi Elite Cup: 1995

Al-Quwa Al-Jawiya
Iraqi Premier League: 1996–97, 2020–21
Iraq FA Cup: 1996–97, 2020–21
Iraqi Elite Cup: 1996
Iraqi Super Cup: 1997

Al-Zawraa
Iraqi Premier League: 2017–18
Iraqi Super Cup: 2017

Al-Jaish
Syrian Premier League: 2009–10

References

1960 births
Living people
Iraqi football managers
Iraqi footballers
Iraqi Assyrian people
Iraqi Christians
Asian Games medalists in football
Footballers at the 1982 Asian Games
Asian Games gold medalists for Iraq
Al-Shorta SC managers
Association football defenders
Medalists at the 1982 Asian Games
Assyrian footballers
Al-Zawraa SC managers
Al-Quwa Al-Jawiya managers
Iraq national football team managers
Iraqi expatriate football managers
Iraq international footballers
Iraqi Premier League managers